Alejandra Ibáñez (born January 26, 2000) is an American wheelchair basketball player. She represented the United States at the 2020 Summer Paralympics.

Career
Ibáñez made her international debut for the United States at the 2018 Wheelchair Basketball World Championship.

Ibáñez represented the United States at the 2020 Summer Paralympics in the wheelchair basketball women's tournament and won a bronze medal.

References

2000 births
Living people
American women's wheelchair basketball players
Medalists at the 2019 Parapan American Games
Paralympic wheelchair basketball players of the United States
Wheelchair basketball players at the 2020 Summer Paralympics
Paralympic bronze medalists for the United States
Medalists at the 2020 Summer Paralympics
Paralympic medalists in wheelchair basketball
Basketball players from Salt Lake City
21st-century American women